The 29th World Cup season began in November 1994 in Park City, USA (December 1994 in Tignes, France for men), and concluded in March 1995 at the World Cup finals in Bormio, Italy.  The overall champions were Alberto Tomba of Italy (his first) and Vreni Schneider of Switzerland (her third).

A break in the schedule was for the 1995 World Championships at Sierra Nevada in southern Spain.  However, due to the lack of snow, these championships were postponed until 1996.

Calendar

Men

Ladies

Men

Overall 

see complete table

In Men's Overall World Cup 1993/94 all results count. Alberto Tomba won the Overall World Cup with only twelve results - eleven wins and one fourth place.

Downhill 

see complete table

In Men's Downhill World Cup 1994/95 all results count. Josef Strobl was able to win his very first World Cup downhill race with start number 61.

Super G 

see complete table

In Men's Super G World Cup 1994/95 all results count. Peter Runggaldier won the cup with only one race win. All races were won by a different athlete.

Giant Slalom 

see complete table

In Men's Giant Slalom World Cup 1994/95 all results count. Alberto Tomba won his fourth Giant Slalom World Cup.

Slalom 

see complete table

In Men's Slalom World Cup 1994/95 all results count. Alberto Tomba won his fourth Slalom World Cup by winning the first seven races in a row. Together with the last two slalom races last season 1993/94, he won 9 slalom races in a row.

Combined 

see complete table

In Men's Combined World Cup 1994/95 both results count. Marc Girardelli won his fourth Combined World Cup.

Ladies

Overall 

see complete table

In Women's Overall World Cup 1993/94 all results count. Vreni Schneider won her third Overall World Cup with only six points margin. Katja Seizinger was unable to score points only in one event (the slalom at Garmisch-Partenkirchen).

Downhill 

see complete table

In the Women's Downhill World Cup 1994/95 all results counted. Picabo Street won six races and five of them in a row. Together with Hilary Lindh, they won nine out of 10 races for the United States.

Super G 

see complete table

In Women's Super G World Cup 1994/95 all results count. Katja Seizinger won her third Super G World Cup in a row.

Giant Slalom 

see complete table

In Women's Giant Slalom World Cup 1994/95 all results count. Vreni Schneider won her fifth Giant Slalom World Cup. But this time she was unable to win a single competition.

Slalom 

see complete table

In Women's Slalom World Cup 1995/96 all results count. Vreni Schneider won her sixth Slalom World Cup, the last four of them in a row.

Combined 

see complete table

In Women's Combined World Cup 1994/95 only one competition was held.

Nations Cup

Men

Ladies

References

External links
FIS-ski.com - World Cup standings - 1995

1994–95
World Cup
World Cup